Walking on Sunshine may refer to:

 Walking on Sunshine (Eddy Grant album), 1981
 "Walking on Sunshine" (Eddy Grant song), a hit for Rockers Revenge in 1982
 Walking on Sunshine (Katrina and the Waves album), 1983
 "Walking on Sunshine" (Katrina and the Waves song)
 "Walking on Sunshine" (Jennifer Lopez song), 2001
 Walking on Sunshine (film), a 2014 film